Wolfsbane Save the World is the fourth studio album by the British heavy metal band Wolfsbane, released in 2012. This was the first album of new material by Wolfsbane since their self-titled album in 1994, although they did record one new song for their 2011 EP Did It for the Money. The album was available on the band's official website, as well as via the merchandise stand on the band's then-upcoming tour.

Track listing
 "Blue Sky" - 5:10
 "Teacher" - 4:05
 "Buy My Pain" - 3:47
 "Starlight" - 4:00
 "Smoke and Red Light" - 3:44
 "Illusion of Love" - 6:03
 "Live Before I Die" - 5:09
 "Who Are You Now" - 3:21
 "Everybody's Looking for Something Baby" - 4:06
 "Child of the Sun" - 3:39
 "Did It for the Money" - 3:34

Personnel

Wolfsbane
 Blaze Bayley - vocals
 Jason Edwards - guitar, producer, engineer
 Jeff Hateley - bass
 Steve "Danger" Ellett - drums

Additional musicians
Givvi Flynn - vocals on track 6, backing vocals on track 8
Chris Catalyst - additional vocals on track 6
Glen Buglass - backing vocals on track 4

References

2012 albums
Wolfsbane (band) albums